Inbar Bakal is an Israeli singer and songwriter. Her debut album Song of Songs produced by Carmen Rizzo, is a mix of Western classical, Arabic and Israeli music.

Bakal now resides in Los Angeles.

Early life
Born and raised in Herzliya, Israel, to a family of Mizrahi Jewish (Yemenite-Jewish and Iraqi-Jewish) descent, she started as a child singer at the age of six, where she was a member of the "Li-Ron Choir" and gained advanced classical training as she participated in International Musical Festivals throughout the Middle East and Europe. When she was 12, her choir performed on the soundtrack to the 1993 film Schindler's List.

Military service
At age 18, Bakal served four years with the Israeli Air Force where she was the first female officer ever in the Anti-Aircraft Combat Division, then a First Lieutenant in Military Intelligence Specializing in Public and International Relations.

Discography

Album
 Song of Songs

References

External links
Official Site

Living people
Arabic-language singers of Israel
Israeli people of Iraqi-Jewish descent
Israeli people of Yemeni-Jewish descent
Musicians from Tel Aviv
Israeli emigrants to the United States
Year of birth missing (living people)
Jewish Israeli musicians
Jewish women singers
Israeli Sephardi Jews
Israeli Mizrahi Jews
Israeli women singer-songwriters
21st-century Israeli women singers